is the 25th single of the Japanese pop singer and songwriter Miho Komatsu released under Giza studio label. It was released 17 August 2005. This is last single where Hirohito Furui did arrangement for Miho Komatsu. The single reached #38 in its first week and sold 3,950 copies. It charted for 2 weeks and sold 4,740 copies. This is the lowest selling single in her career.

Track list
All songs are written and composed by Miho Komatsu

arrangement: Hirohito Furui (Garnet Crow)
it was used as an opening theme for the NTV show Eiga Tengoku Chine Bara.

 arrangement: Hitoshi Okamoto (Garnet Crow)
 
arrangement: Furui
 (instrumental)

References 

2005 singles
Miho Komatsu songs
Songs written by Miho Komatsu
2005 songs
Giza Studio singles
Being Inc. singles
Song recordings produced by Daiko Nagato